Vaucher is a surname. Notable people with the surname include:

Alfred Vaucher (1887–1993), French theologian
Denis Vaucher (1898–1993), Swiss military patrol runner
Gee Vaucher (born 1945), English anarchist
Jean Pierre Étienne Vaucher (1763–1841), Swiss Protestant pastor and botanist
Yvette Vaucher (born 1929), Swiss mountaineer and parachutist